Steven Hoggett (born 30 November 1971) is a British choreographer and movement director. He has won an Olivier Award as well as an Obie Award, has been nominated four times for a Drama Desk Award and three times for a Tony Award.

Early life
Hoggett was brought up near Huddersfield, England. As a youth, he participated in the Huddersfield Choral Society Youth Choir and held jobs at Boots UK and a restaurant. He studied at Swansea University, where he studied literature.

Career
Hoggett gained early experience at a workshop with Volcano Theatre Company, based in Swansea. He then founded a physical theatre company in Wales called Frantic Assembly, with his friend and fellow student Scott Graham. The company's first production was a 1994 revival of John Osborne's classic Look Back in Anger, in which Hoggett directed, produced, and performed.

The company staged numerous productions in their early years, especially at the Edinburgh Fringe Festival. Their unique blend of theatre and movement began to attract attention, and soon Frantic Assembly were producing large scale touring work and collaborating with some of the UK's biggest theatre companies. Hoggett would go on to direct and choreograph several shows for the company, including "Beautiful Burnout" (with the National Theatre of Scotland), an adaptation of Shakespeare's Othello, "pool, no water", "Stockholm", and "Little Dogs" (with National Theatre Wales).

He first worked with childhood friend John Tiffany while Tiffany was Associate Director at the Traverse Theatre, Edinburgh on a production of Gregory Burke's The Straits in 2003. 

The pair then went on to collaborate on what would be their biggest success to date, Gregory Burke's Black Watch, which was first produced by the National Theatre of Scotland at the Edinburgh Festival Fringe in 2006 

The piece was an instant success, and would garner Hoggett the Laurence Olivier Award for Best Theatre Choreographer at the 2009 Laurence Olivier Awards, along with a slew of other awards. The show undertook several extremely successful international tours, including a stint at the St. Ann's Warehouse in Brooklyn, which would lead to Hoggett working on many new productions in the USA. These included American Idiot, Peter and the Starcatcher and Once, the musical adaptation of the hit independent film, directed by John Tiffany.

Once earned more Tony nominations (11) than any other production for the 2011–12 season. He also received a 2012 Obie Award special citation (along with Once colleagues Tiffany and Martin Lowe).

His other recent productions include choreography for the National Theatre production of The Curious Incident of the Dog in the Night Time (with Scott Graham), which garnered the pair an Olivier nomination. With Tiffany, an adaptation of the Swedish vampire novel Let The Right One In for the National Theatre of Scotland, Tony Nominated Fight Choreography for Rocky The Musical and Sting's new musical, The Last Ship.

Hoggett provided choreography for a computer animated sequence in the DreamWorks feature film How To Train Your Dragon 2. 

On 26 June 2015, it was announced that he would be working on the Harry Potter stage play The Cursed Child with long time collaborator John Tiffany. He went on to be nominated for the 2017 Laurence Olivier Award for best choreography for his work on the production. The production transferred to Broadway in April 2018.

Personal life
Steven married Kyle Callicott in March 2016.

Major theatre credits

Notes

External links
 
Hoggett at BroadwayWorld.com

Living people
1970s births
British choreographers